Godfred Asiamah (born 26 December 1999) is a Ghanaian professional footballer who plays as midfielder for Ghana Premier League side Asante Kotoko S.C. He previously had stints in New Edubiase United and Ashanti Gold SC.

Club career

New Edubiase United 
Asiamah started his career with New Edubiase United F.C, he featured for them during the 2016 Ghana Premier League. He made his debut on 21 February 2016 in a 1–0 loss to Accra Hearts of Oak, playing 73 minutes before being substituted for Emmanuel Nketia. At the age of 17 years, he played in 12 league matches and scored 1 goal and was one of the bright stars for the club even though the club placed last and were relegated to the Ghana Division One League. After that period he went on trials with some Belgian and German clubs but could not land a deal in Europe as expected. In 2017, he also trained with Swedish side AIK Stockholm after his impressive Ghana Premier League debut season but could not secure a permanent deal.

Tema United 
Asiamah played for lower-tier side Tema United before he was sent on a 1-year loan deal to Ashanti Gold in 2018. In December 2017, he joined CK Akunnor's Northern Sector squad during the renaming match of the Tamale Stadium to Aliu Mahama Sports Stadium.

Ashanti Gold (loan) 
In March 2018, Asiamah signed a season-long loan deal with Obuasi-based club Ashanti Gold S.C. to bolster CK Akunnor's squad for the season. He made his debut on 17 March 2018, playing the full 90 minutes in a 1–0 win against Wa All Stars. He played in 10 league matches during the 2018 Ghanaian Premier League before the league was brought to an abrupt end due to dissolution of the GFA in June 2018, as a result of the Anas Number 12 Expose.

Asante Kotoko 
In July 2019, Asiamah secured a moved to Kumasi Asante Kotoko. He signed a three-year deal after fruitful negotiations with Tema United and completing his mandatory medicals. He failed to compand a place in the starting 11 in the 2019–20 Ghana Premier League, his first season with the club due to the presence of Justice Blay and Kwame Adom Frimpong. As a result of his limited play time there were reports that he was moving on a loan deal to struggling team Karela United till the end of the season with an option of permanent transfer if they could avoid relegation. The deal did not materialise as the league was later cancelled due to the COVID-19 pandemic. In November 2020, he was named in the club's squad list ahead of the 2020–21 Ghana Premier League season. He made his debut on 22 November 2020, playing the full 90 minutes in a 1–1 draw against Berekum Chelsea. He played a part in the club's 2020–21 CAF Champions League and 2020–21 CAF Confederation Cup campaign, playing in 4 matches including both legs against FC Nouadhibou, 1 match against Al-Hilal Club Omdurman and 1 match against ES Sétif.

References

External links 
 
 
 

1999 births
Living people
Association football midfielders
Ghanaian footballers
New Edubiase United F.C. players
Ghana Premier League players
Ashanti Gold SC players
Asante Kotoko S.C. players